Filippo Ferrarini (born 7 September 1990) is an Italian rugby union player who plays as a flanker for Rugby Noceto in Serie A.

In 2016 he also played for Ohio Aviators in the US PRO Rugby competition and he previously played with Zebre in the Pro12. In 2016-17 Pro12 season he named as Additional Player for Benetton Treviso.

He was called for Italy A squad at the 2013 IRB Nations Cup.

References

External links
 http://www.itsrugby.co.uk/player-16271.html 
 http://www.espn.co.uk/italy/rugby/player/124485.html 
 http://www.scoresway.com/?sport=rugby&page=player&id=2306

1990 births
Living people
Italian rugby union players
Aironi players
Ohio Aviators players
Zebre Parma players
Rugby union flankers